Bimal Shah is an Indian politician. He was elected to the Gujarat Legislative Assembly from Kapadvanj in the 1998 and 2002 Gujarat Legislative Assembly election as a member of the Bharatiya Janata Party. He was the Transport Minister in Keshubhai Patel cabinet from 1999 to 2001. He joined Indian National Congress in January 2019.

References

1961 births
Living people
Indian National Congress politicians from Gujarat
People from Ahmedabad
Gujarat MLAs 1998–2002
Gujarat MLAs 2002–2007